Indian Institute of Information Technology, Manipur (IIITM) is one among the prestigious Indian Institutes of Information Technology, a group of 25 Interdisciplinary Technical Universities of higher education started by the Government of India, focused on Information Technology. It is an "Institute of National Importance", declared by an act of parliament.

On 9 August 2017, The Indian Institutes of Information Technology (Public-Private Partnership) Act, 2017 has been notified in the Gazette of India. The act confers the "Institute Of National Importance" (INI) status on 15 IIITs set up on the public-private partnership (PPP) mode in Vadodara, Guwahati, Sri City, Kota, Tiruchirappalli, Kalyani, Una, Sonepat, Lucknow, Kottayam, Manipur, Dharwad, Pune, Nagpur, and Ranchi.

Campus 
IIIT Senapati, Manipur is currently operational from its own city campus of 13 Acres located in Mantripukhri, Imphal. The campus is located in very close proximity to Manipur High Court, CRPF Camp, Manipur Information Technology Park, Manipur Software Technology Park, and Secretariat. Considering that the campus is located in an urban area, all the required facilities are available nearby. There are 6 Hostels for boys and 1 for girls with one more hostel under construction and it also has a 200-seater fully operational food court. The college is expected to shift to its permanent campus of 150 acres in the Senapati District of Manipur which is under construction with a budget of around 125 crores by the year 2024.

Departments 
 Department of Electronics and Communication Engineering (ECE)

 Department of Humanities and Basic Sciences (HBS)
 Department of Computer Science & Engineering (CSE)

Labs 
The campus has fully functional and highly specialized labs such as:

 Data engineering lab
 Software Engineering Lab
 Computer Graphics Lab
 VLSI Lab
 Basic Electronics Lab
 Digital Design Lab

Sports Facilities 
The campus has the following sports facilities:

 Volleyball Court
 Badminton Court
 Football Ground
 Cricket Ground
 Table Tennis
 Chess
 Open Gym

Clubs 
The college has the following fully active clubs under the aegis of Technical and Cultural Board of IIITM :

 Coding Club
 Google Developer Student Club (GDSC)
 Artificial Intelligence and Machine Learning (AI/ML) Club
 Android Development Club
 Cloud Computing Club
 Cyber Security Club
 Web Development Club
 Literature Club
 Poetry Club (Qurbat)
 Chess Club
 Swimming Club
 Photography Club
 VLSI-Embedded Club
 Performing Arts (Dance & Drama Club)

Cell/Centre/Division 
 Alumni Association Cell
 Quality Improvement Cell
 Training & Placement Cell
 Equity Cell
 International Relation Division
 Research Board
 Innovation and Incubation Cell
 NEP 2020 Implementation Committee 
 Anti Ragging Committee
 Anti Sexual Harassment Committee
 NEP 2020 Implementation Committee
 Academic Block
 Administrative Block

Academics

Admissions 
Admissions are purely based on merit through the Nationwide Joint Entrance Exam (JEE) Mains which is conducted for the purpose of admission of students into IITs, IIITs, and NITs and the seat allocation will be through Joint Seat Allocation Authority (JoSAA) and Central Seat Allocation Board (CSAB).

The following programs are taught in IIITSM:

Bachelors 

 BTech in Computer Science & Engineering (Course Code: 4110)
 BTech in Computer Science & Engineering with Specialization in Artificial and Data Science [Course Code: 410R]
 BTech in Electronics & Communication Engineering (Course Code: 4114)
 BTech in Electronics & Communication Engineering with Specialization in VLSI & Embedded Systems [Course Code: 410M]

PhDs

Memorandum of understanding (MoU), Collaborations and Partnerships 
IIIT Manipur has collaborated with various colleges and universities. IIIT Manipur has signed MoUs with various industries and companies.
 With Korean Cultural Centre India on November 2, 2022
 With University of North Texas, USA on April 24, 2022
 With University of Colorado, Springs, USA
 With University of Houston, USA
 With NUS Singapore
 With IIT Kharagpur
 With IIT Guwahati
 With Central Agricultural University, Imphal on 16th September 2022
 With Ugra Research Institute of Information Technology, Russia on June 5, 2017

See also 

 Indian Institutes of Technology
 National Institutes of Technology (India)
 Indian Institutes of Information Technology
 Indian Institute of Science

References

http://www.iiitmanipur.ac.in/pages/about/about.php

External links

Manipur
Engineering colleges in Manipur
2015 establishments in Manipur
Educational institutions established in 2015